L'asino (also called L'asino d'oro; English: The Golden Ass) is an unfinished satirical poem of eight cantos written by the Italian political scientist and writer Niccolò Machiavelli in 1517. A modernized version of Apuleius' The Golden Ass (rather than a translation of it), it is written in terza rima. It also concerns the theme of metamorphosis, and contains grotesque and allegorical episodes.

In the poem, the author meets a beautiful herdswoman surrounded by Circe's herd of beasts (Canto 2). After spending a night of love with him, she explains the characteristics of the animals in her charge: the lions are the brave, the bears are the violent, the wolves are those forever dissatisfied, and so on (Canto 6). In Canto 7 he is introduced to those who experience frustration: a cat that has allowed its prey to escape; an agitated dragon; a fox constantly on the look-out for traps; a dog that bays the moon; Aesop's lion in love that allowed himself to be deprived of his teeth and claws. There are also emblematic satirical portraits of various Florentine personalities. In the eighth and last canto he has a conversation with a pig that, like the Gryllus of Plutarch's Moralia, does not want to be changed back and condemns human greed, cruelty and conceit.

References

Further reading
 Mew, Joseph (1882). "Machiavelli's 'Golden Ass'," The Gentleman's Magazine, Vol. CCLII, pp. 104–115.

· Diego von Vacano, (2007). The Art of Power: Machiavelli, Nietzsche, and the Making of Aesthetic Political Theory. Lanham, MD: Lexington Books.

External links
 L'Asino (complete text)   
 There is an English translation in Volume 2 (pp. 750–772) of "Machiavelli: The Chief Works and Others"  edited and translated by Allan Gilbert. https://books.google.com/books?id=gx2l3vh2OtIC&lpg=PP1&pg=PP1#v=onepage&q&f=false
 There is a French translation in Oeuvres complètes X, Paris 1825, pp.401-453

1517 poems
Unfinished poems
Works by Niccolò Machiavelli
Works based on The Golden Ass